The 1974 season in Swedish football, starting April 1974 and ending November 1974:

Honours

Official titles

Notes

References 
Online

 
Seasons in Swedish football